Passionless Moments is a 1983 short Australian drama film written and directed by Jane Campion and Gerard Lee. It was screened in the Un Certain Regard section at the 1986 Cannes Film Festival.

Cast
 David Benton - Ed Tumbury
 Ann Burriman - Gwen Gilbert
 Alan Brown - Neighbor / Neighbor
 Sean Callinan - Jim Newbury
 Paul Chubb - Jim Simpson
 Sue Collie - Angela Elliott
 Haedyn Cunningham - Board Member
 Ron Gobert - Board Member
 Elias Ibrahim - Ibrahim Ibrahim
 Paul Melchert - Arnold
 George Nezovic - Gavin Metchalle
 Jamie Pride - Lyndsay Aldridge
 Gordon Quiller - Board Member
 Keith Smith - Board Member
 Yves Stening - Shaun

References

External links

Passionless Moments at Oz Movies

1983 films
1983 short films
1983 drama films
1983 independent films
Australian drama short films
Australian independent films
Films directed by Jane Campion
1980s English-language films
1980s Australian films